The Women's National Cricket League (WNCL) is the national domestic 50-over competition for women's cricket in Australia. Featuring seven teams—one from every state, plus the Australian Capital Territory—each season's winner is awarded the Ruth Preddy Cup. New South Wales have historically dominated the competition, appearing in the first 24 title deciders and winning 20 championships. The streak of final appearances was broken in the 2020–21 season when they finished in fourth place. Tasmania are the current champions, having won back-to-back titles across the 2021–22 and 2022–23 seasons.

Beginning in 1996–97, the WNCL replaced the Australian Women's Cricket Championships which had taken place in a two-week tournament format since 1930–31. In conjunction with its Twenty20 counterparts—the more recently established Australian Women's Twenty20 Cup and its high-profile successor, the Women's Big Bash League (WBBL)—the league is cited as a bedrock foundation for developing the standard of women's cricket in the country, helping to produce world-class talent as well as attracting top international players. In particular, it is considered a crucial platform for Australia's finest young cricketers to further develop their skills and strive for national team selection.

The WNCL has experienced a rising level of professionalism since its inception, though the most notable breakthrough occurred in 2017 when the Australian Cricketers' Association negotiated a watershed deal with Cricket Australia to expand the total female payment pool from $7.5 million to $55.2 million.

Teams 

The tournament features seven teams, with matches played across Australia at a combination of bigger venues including the WACA Ground in Perth and Blundstone Arena in Hobart, as well as smaller grounds including CitiPower Centre in Melbourne and Karen Rolton Oval in Adelaide.

Originally a five-team competition, the league was expanded to include the Australian Capital Territory in 2009–10 and Tasmania in 2010–11. Cricket ACT fields a team in the league despite being a non-member association of Cricket Australia.

Results

Season summaries 

Sources:

Final(s) summaries

1996–2007
From the inaugural season through to 2006–07, the two top-ranked teams on the points table at the conclusion of the regular season would go on to compete in a best-of-three finals series to determine a champion. Dead rubbers were played out in the first two seasons, though such a practice was discontinued thereafter.

2007–present
Coinciding with the introduction of the Australian Women's Twenty20 Cup, the WNCL finals series was reduced to a single match from  onward. However, the 2012–13 and 2014–15 seasons utilised an extended four-team playoffs system which included knockout semi-finals.

Team performance 
LegendC = Champions; RU = Runners-up; SF = Semi-finalists; 1st/2nd/3rd/4th/5th/6th/7th = Ladder position after regular season

|-
! 1996–97 !! 1997–98 !! 1998–99 !! 1999–00 !! 2000–01 !! 2001–02 !! 2002–03 !! 2003–04 !! 2004–05 !! 2005–06 !! 2006–07 !! 2007–08 !! 2008–09 !! 2009–10 !! 2010–11 !! 2011–12 !! 2012–13 !! 2013–14 !! 2014–15 !! 2015–16 !! 2016–17 !! 2017–18 !! 2018–19 !! 2019–20 !! 2020–21 !! 2021–22 !! 2022–23
|-align=center
| style="background:darkgray;"|  || style="background:darkgray;"|  || style="background:darkgray;"|  || style="background:darkgray;"|  || style="background:darkgray;"|  || style="background:darkgray;"|  || style="background:darkgray;"|  || style="background:darkgray;"|  || style="background:darkgray;"|  || style="background:darkgray;"|  || style="background:darkgray;"|  || style="background:darkgray;"|  || style="background:darkgray;"|  || 3rd || 3rd || 3rd || 5th || 6th || 5th || 4th || 5th || 4th || 4th || 5th || 6th || 4th || 7th
|- align=center
| style="background:lime;"|2nd (C) || style="background:lime;"|2nd (C) || style="background:lime;"|1st (C) || style="background:lime;"|1st (C) || style="background:lime;"|1st (C) || style="background:lime;"|1st (C) || style="background:yellow;"|2nd (RU) || style="background:lime;"|2nd (C) || style="background:yellow;"|1st (RU) || style="background:lime;"|1st (C) || style="background:lime;"|2nd (C) || style="background:lime;"|1st (C) || style="background:lime;"|1st (C) || style="background:lime;"|2nd (C) || style="background:lime;"|1st (C) || style="background:lime;"|1st (C) || style="background:lime;"|1st (C) || style="background:lime;"|1st (C) || style="background:lime;"|4th (C) || style="background:yellow;"|1st (RU) || style="background:lime;"|2nd (C) || style="background:lime;"|1st (C) || style="background:lime;"|1st (C) || style="background:yellow;"|1st (RU) || 4th || 3rd || 6th
|-align=center
| 5th || 4th || 4th || 4th || style="background:yellow;"|2nd (RU) || 4th || 4th || 5th || 4th || style="background:yellow;"|2nd (RU) || 3rd || 5th || 4th || 5th || 6th || 5th || style="background:yellow;"|2nd (RU) || 5th || style="background:#afeeee;"|2nd (SF) || 3rd || style="background:yellow;"|1st (RU) || 5th || style="background:yellow;"|2nd (RU) || 3rd || style="background:lime;"|2nd (C) || 5th || 3rd
|-align=center
| 3rd || style="background:yellow;"|1st (RU) || 3rd || 5th || 3rd || 3rd || 3rd || 3rd || 3rd || 3rd || 4th || style="background:yellow;"|2nd (RU) || 5th || 6th || 5th || 4th || 6th || 4th || style="background:yellow;"|3rd (RU) || style="background:lime;"|2nd (C) || 4th  || 3rd || 7th || 7th || 5th || style="background:yellow;"|2nd (RU) || style="background:yellow;"|2nd (RU)
|-align=center
| style="background:darkgray;"|  || style="background:darkgray;"|  || style="background:darkgray;"|  || style="background:darkgray;"|  || style="background:darkgray;"|  || style="background:darkgray;"|  || style="background:darkgray;"|  || style="background:darkgray;"|  || style="background:darkgray;"|  || style="background:darkgray;"|  || style="background:darkgray;"|  || style="background:darkgray;"|  || style="background:darkgray;"|  || style="background:darkgray;"| || 7th || 6th || 7th || 7th || 6th || 7th || 6th || 7th || 3rd || 6th || 3rd || style="background:lime;"|1st (C) || style="background:lime;"|1st (C)
|-align=center
| style="background:yellow;"|1st (RU) || 3rd || style="background:yellow;"|2nd (RU) || 3rd || 5th || style="background:yellow;"|2nd (RU) || style="background:lime;"|1st (C) || style="background:yellow;"|1st (RU) || style="background:lime;"|2nd (C) || 4th || style="background:yellow;"|1st (RU) || 4th || style="background:yellow;"|2nd (RU) || style="background:yellow;"|1st (RU) || style="background:yellow;"|2nd (RU) || style="background:yellow;"|2nd (RU) || style="background:#afeeee;"|3rd (SF) || style="background:yellow;"|2nd (RU) || style="background:#afeeee;"|1st (SF) || 5th || 3rd || 6th || 5th || 4th || style="background:yellow;"|1st (RU) || 6th || 4th
|-align=center
| 4th || 5th || 5th || style="background:yellow;"|2nd (RU) || 4th || 5th || 5th || 4th || 5th || 5th || 5th || 3rd || 3rd || 4th || 4th || 7th || style="background:#afeeee;"|4th (SF) || 3rd || 7th || 6th || 7th || style="background:yellow;"|2nd (RU) || 6th || style="background:lime;"|2nd (C) || 7th || 7th || 5th

See also

Women's Big Bash League
Women's cricket in Australia
Australian Women's Twenty20 Cup

Notes

References

External links

WNCL at Cricket Australia
WNCL web page with squad lists, results and records (archived January 2012)

 
 
Cricket
Australian domestic cricket competitions
1996 establishments in Australia
Sports leagues established in 1996